Brent Alan "Wooter" Wooten (1939 – August 29, 2011) was an American football player and coach. He served as the head football coach at Eastern Washington University in Cheney, Washington from 1968 to 1970, compiling a record of 11–18.

Head coaching record

Football

References

External links
 

1939 births
2011 deaths
American football halfbacks
Eastern Washington Eagles athletic directors
Eastern Washington Eagles football coaches
Washington Huskies football players
College wrestling coaches in the United States
Junior college football coaches in the United States
People from Anacortes, Washington
Players of American football from Washington (state)